Bua Yai is a district (amphoe) in the northern part of Nakhon Ratchasima province, northern central Thailand.

History
Bua Yai dates back to the frontier town called Dan Nok (ด่านนอก). The center of the town was Ban Nong Lang Yai. In 1868, it was upgraded to Dan Nok District and the town center was moved to Ban Nong Lang Noi. The district office was moved again to Ban Bua Yai in 1905, and the district was renamed accordingly. The office was three kilometers from the Bua Yai railway junction. The presence of the railway spurred development of the village Ban Fat Fueay which became the new site of the district office in 1951.

Geography
Neighbouring districts are (from the north clockwise): Waeng Noi of Khon Kaen province; Bua Lai, Sida, Non Daeng, Khong, Ban Lueam, and Kaeng Sanam Nang of Nakhon Ratchasima Province.

Administration
The district is divided into 10 sub-districts (tambons). The town (thesaban mueang) of Bua Yai covers part of tambon Bua Yai.

The missing numbers are tambons which now form the districts Kaeng Sanam Nang, Sida, and Bua Lai.

Bua Yai